Janardan Dwivedi is an Indian politician and member of the Indian National Congress.

Early life
Dwivedi was born in Lodhawara in the present-day Chitrakoot district, Uttar Pradesh.

Political career
In May 2009 he took charge from Veerappa Moily as Manager of Media Department of Congress in addition to serving as the party General Secretary. He was the general secretary (Administration)of Congress Party.

He was on the four member committee that included Rahul Gandhi, A.K.Antony and Ahmed Patel to look after the party's affairs in Sonia Gandhi's absence.

Controversies
On 6 June 2011, during a press conference in Delhi he criticized Swami Ramdev and the Bharatiya Janata Party.
Dwivedi had a shoe thrown at his face as an insult by Sunil Kumar, who claimed to be a journalist from Jhunjhunu in Rajasthan state.

Stand on reservation
On 4 February 2014, he urged congress vice-president Rahul Gandhi to reconsider the party's stand on caste based reservations in India. He said that caste based reservation should end and urged all the financially backward class to get the benefit irrespective of caste. 
However, congress party separated from Dwivedi's view saying that it was his personal view and not the party's.
Congress president Sonia Gandhi later clarified the party's stand and said that Caste based reservations should continue for SCs, STs and OBCs.

References

External links
 Profile at Delhi Legislative Assembly
 Profile on Rajya Sabha website

1945 births
Living people
Indian National Congress politicians
People from Chitrakoot district
Rajya Sabha members from Delhi